Turchaninov is a Russian surname. It originated from the archaic word turchanin, meaning "Turk".

It which may refer to: 

 Turchaninov family, a noble family in the Russian Empire.
 Alexei Turchaninov (1704/1705–1787)
 Pyotr Ivanovitch Turchaninov (born 1746–c. 1823), Secretary of State on military questions of Catherine I of Russia. He had two sons:
 Pavel Turchaninov (1776—1839), Russian lieutenant general during the Napoleonic Wars.
 Andrey Turchaninov (1779–1830), his younger brother, the lieutenant general.
 Nikolai Turczaninow or Turchaninov (1796-1863), botanist
 Lev Chernyi, born Pavel Dimitrievich Turchaninov (c. 1878–1921), Russian anarchist, activist and poet, and a leading figure of the Third Russian Revolution
 Ivan Turchaninov (1821-1901), Union Army general in the American Civil War

Russian-language surnames